Renoth is a surname. Notable people with the surname include:

Heidi Renoth (born 1978), German snowboarder
Herbert Renoth (born 1962), German alpine skier